Jelenec is a municipality and village in the Nitra District of the south-west of Slovakia, in the Nitra Region.

See also
 List of municipalities and towns in Slovakia

Genealogical resources
The records for genealogical research are available at the state archive "Statny Archiv in Nitra, Slovakia"

 Roman Catholic church records (births/marriages/deaths): 1713-1901 (parish B)
 Lutheran church records (births/marriages/deaths): 1827-1894 (parish B)

References

External links
Surnames of living people in Jelenec

Villages and municipalities in Nitra District